Khalid Mansoor is the Special Assistant to the Prime Minister of Pakistan on the China-Pakistan Economic Corridor, a position he has held since August 2021. He previously served as the Chief Executive of the Hub Power Company.

References

Living people
Pakistani businesspeople
Pakistani politicians
Year of birth missing (living people)